Erigeron taipeiensis is a Chinese species of flowering plant in the family Asteraceae. It grows in subalpine meadows in the Taibai Mountains Shaanxi province.

Erigeron taipeiensis is a perennial, clumping-forming herb up to 35 cm (14 inches) tall. Its flower heads have lilac ray florets surrounding yellow disc florets.

References

taipeiensis
Flora of Shaanxi
Plants described in 1973